Kelsey Nakanelua (born 22 December 1966, Hawaii) is an athlete who represented American Samoa.

Nakanelua competed twice at the Olympics, firstly he entered the 100 metres at the 2000 Summer Olympics, he ran a time of 10.93 seconds and finished 8th in his heat out of nine starters so didn't qualify for the next round, four years later at the 2004 Summer Olympics again he entered the 100 metres and this time finished 7th in his heat so didn't advance. He is the 6 time Hawaii's Fastest Human (95-98,01,06) and has a personal best and the official Hawaii State Record of 10.59.http://archives.starbulletin.com/2000/09/14/sports/story2.html

References

External links
 

1966 births
Living people
American Samoan male sprinters
American people of Samoan descent
Athletes (track and field) at the 2000 Summer Olympics
Athletes (track and field) at the 2004 Summer Olympics
Olympic track and field athletes of American Samoa
People from Laie
Sportspeople from Hawaii